Dominant cadence may refer to:

ii-V-I turnaround
Cadence (music)#Half cadence